RMS Arabia was a P&O ocean liner. She was sunk in the Mediterranean in 1916 by a German U-boat during World War I.

History
Caird & Company built  Arabia at Greenock on the River Clyde, launching her in November 1897 and completing her in March 1898. She had capacity for 317 first class and 152 second class passengers, a total of 469. She was the first ocean liner to have a children's playroom.

Arabias route was between Tilbury and Bombay. On her maiden voyage she took Lord Kedleston to take up his post as Viceroy of India. In 1902 she took passengers to India for the 1903 Delhi Durbar.

On 15 March 1905  the  cargo steamship  was manœuvreing in Bombay Harbour when she struck Arabia amidships on her port side, damaging the liner's promenade deck, boat deck and upper works. The collision was caused by Riverdales chief engineer inexplicably setting her engine to go ahead when ordered to go astern.

On 12 October 1912 the steamship Powerful collided with Arabia in the English Channel off Southampton. Powerfuls bow holed the crew WC above the waterline, crushing lascar crewman Hassan Moosa to death.

In 1915 and 1916 Arabia made three voyages between Britain and Australia. Arabia launched her boats within 15 minutes. Four armed trawlers and Ellerman Lines'  passenger liner  rescued survivors.

187 Australians were aboard Arabia. Her sinking helped surge volunteer enlistment in the Australian armed forces.

Notes

External links
 

 

1897 ships
Ships built on the River Clyde
International maritime incidents
Maritime incidents in 1905
Maritime incidents in 1912
Maritime incidents in 1916
Ocean liners
Passenger ships of the United Kingdom
Ships of P&O (company)
Ships sunk by German submarines in World War I
Steamships of the United Kingdom
World War I passenger ships of the United Kingdom
World War I shipwrecks in the Mediterranean Sea